is a Japanese actor and singer. Since 1986, he has appeared in a number of television series and movies. He is married to the singer-songwriter Chisato Moritaka, with whom he has a son and a daughter.

Filmography

Film

Television

Japanese dub

References

External links

Japanese male film actors
Japanese male television actors
Japanese poets
1967 births
Living people
Male actors from Tokyo
20th-century Japanese male actors
21st-century Japanese male actors